Sir Peter James Housden  (born 7 December 1950) is a former public official who worked in local and central government.  He served as Permanent Secretary to the Scottish Government from June 2010 to June 2015. He was previously Permanent Secretary of the Department for Communities and Local Government.

Early life
Housden was born on 7 December 1950 and was educated at Grove Comprehensive School, Market Drayton, Shropshire. He studied at the University of Essex where he graduated in 1973 with a First in Sociology. He began his career as a comprehensive school teacher in Shropshire and worked as an education officer in three county LEAs.

Public Service
Housden was appointed as Director of Education in Nottinghamshire in 1991. In 1994, Peter was appointed as Chief Executive and in his seven years in that post managed Nottinghamshire County Council through Local Government Review and a wide-ranging programme of modernisation. In September 2000 he was seconded to the Audit Commission for six months to lead their work on the NHS national plan.

Housden joined the Department for Education and Skills in November 2001 as Director General for Schools. He had overall responsibility for all the Department's work in schools and in early years, and for current priorities on primary standards and secondary reform. He held this role until his appointment as Permanent Secretary of ODPM in 2005.

He was appointed Permanent Secretary to the Scottish Government from June 2010. In his role as Scotland's Permanent Secretary, Sir Peter was the principal policy adviser to the First Minister and the Cabinet and led significant work on the integration of public services and new approaches to leadership in public services workforces.  He was a member of the UK Civil Service Board and its Senior Leadership Committee. As Permanent Secretary in Scotland, his impartiality over Scottish Independence was called into question with for example the Labour leader Iain Gray accusing Housden of having "gone native", but was consistently defended by the leaders of the UK Civil Service.

Peter Housden is a Trustee of the RNLI.

Peter Housden is Chair of The Civil Service Club.

Publications 

 'The Passing of a Country Grammar School' (APS, 2015)
 'Local Statesman' (Local Government Centre, Warwick University, 2000)
 'Bucking the Market: LEAs and Special Needs' (NASEN, 1993).

Honours and awards
Housden was appointed Knight Commander of the Order of the Bath (KCB) in the 2010 Birthday Honours.

References

1950 births
Living people
Permanent Secretaries of the Scottish Executive
Permanent Under-Secretaries of State for Communities and Local Government
Permanent Secretaries of the Office of the Deputy Prime Minister
Civil servants in the Department for Education and Skills
Alumni of the University of Essex
Academics of the University of Warwick
Local government officers in England
Schoolteachers from Shropshire
Knights Commander of the Order of the Bath